The 1967–68 Alpha Ethniki was the 32nd season of the highest football league of Greece. The season began on 8 October 1967 and ended on 10 June 1968. AEK Athens won their fourth Greek title and their first one in five years. The season was the first of several seasons in which the Cypriot champion would play in the Alpha Ethniki the following season.  Olympiakos Nicosia finished second to last and were relegated back to the Cypriot First Division.

The point system was: Win: 3 points - Draw: 2 points - Loss: 1 point.

League table

Results

|+Relegation play-offs

|}

Top scorers

External links
Greek Wikipedia
Official Greek FA Site
Greek SuperLeague official Site
SuperLeague Statistics

Alpha Ethniki seasons
Greece
1967–68 in Greek football leagues